Wemmershoek is a settlement in Cape Winelands District Municipality in the Western Cape province of South Africa.

Wemmershoek is a small village at the junction of the R301 and R45 roads. The Wemmershoek Dam on the Wemmershoek River was established in 1957.

Popular culture
Was the location of filming for the BBC's "Special Forces - Ultimate Hell Week"

References

Populated places in the Stellenbosch Local Municipality